Ramón Ayarza (born 28 August 1993) is a Chilean rugby union player, currently playing for Súper Liga Americana de Rugby side Selknam. His preferred position is prop.

Professional career
Ayarza signed for Súper Liga Americana de Rugby side Selknam ahead of the 2021 Súper Liga Americana de Rugby season. He previously played for Bayonne in France, while he also had spells at La Voulte-Valence, Montauban and Anglet.

References

External links
itsrugby.co.uk Profile

1993 births
Living people
Chilean rugby union players
Rugby union props
Rugby union hookers
Selknam (rugby union) players
Aviron Bayonnais players
US Montauban players
Chile international rugby union players
Soyaux Angoulême XV Charente players
Toronto Arrows players